This is a list of famous and notable Mexican dubbing voice actors in alphabetical order by last names, where applicable. This would include persons who are known to a large number of people and is not based on the extent of their popularity. Neither is the list viewed from the context of the present. Their fame could be brief; what matters is that they were well known during the peak of their popularity.

In the Hispanic community the dubbed voices of famous film actors are remembered better and became widely recognizable (e.g. the Spanish voice of Homer Simpson from The Simpsons (translated as "Homero"), performed by Humberto Vélez, is one of the most famous in Latin America).

These actors often become stars in the science fiction or subgenre fandoms (such as anime fandom) and become guests in fan conventions.

Famous voice actors

Pre-1970s generation
 Jorge Arvizu (Voice of Bugs Bunny, Fred Flintstone ("Pedro Picapiedra"), Ringo Starr, and George Harrison in The Beatles animated series.) (1932–2014)
 Jesús Barrero: Voice of Rick Hunter (first voice) in Robotech, Luke Skywalker in Star Wars (fourth voice), Pegasus Seiya in Saint Seiya, Rex in the Toy Story films, Flik in A Bug's Life, Banzai in The Lion King and Kuzco in The Emperor's New Groove and The Emperor's New School (1951–2016)
Narciso Busquets: Regarded by his actor peers as one of the greatest voice actors and directors, he directed and acted in countless films, TV shows, anime, etc. Known for his mastery of the dubbing technique, and his disciplined, energetic, strict attitude on voice directing, he served as a mentor on voice acting for countless actors from later generations. He's known as one of the first actors in Mexico who did dubbing of himself on movies he appeared as early as 1937. Voice of George C. Scott in Patton, first voice of Slimer in The Real Ghostbusters, voice of Professor Ratigan in The Great Mouse Detective (1931-1989)
 Irma Carmona: Voice of Brother Bear in The Berenstain Bears, Ranma Saotome (female) in Ranma ½ and Sailor Neptune in Sailor Moon, (born 1960)
 Francisco Colmenero: voice of Pumbaa in The Lion King, Goofy in productions until the mid 1990s, Pete in many Disney Productions, Templeton the rat in Charlotte's Web, Grumpy in Snow White and The Seven Dwarfs (2nd voice), Earl in Dinosaurs and the narrator in Beauty and the Beast) (still active) (born 1932)
 José Lavat: Voice of Superman, Indiana Jones, John Kramer/Jigsaw in Saw, HAL 9000 in 2001: A Space Odyssey, Count Dooku in the Star Wars Franchise, Aslan in The Chronicles of Narnia franchise Ian McKellen, and Robert De Niro (1948–2018)
 Jorge Lavat
 Arturo Mercado (voice of Beast in Beauty and the Beast, Shaggy Rogers (first voice), adult Simba, Scrooge McDuck, Darkwing Duck, George Clooney, Kevin Flynn/Clu in Tron and Tron Legacy, Wooldoor Sockbat in Drawn Together) (still active) (Born 1940)
 Fanny Schiller: Voice of the Fairy Godmother in Cinderella, Snapdragon (purple flower) in Alice in Wonderland, Aunt Sara in Lady and the Tramp, Flora in Sleeping Beauty, and Pearl Slaghoople in The Flintstones (1901–1971)
 Esteban Siller: Voice of Gargamel, Yosemite Sam (third voice), and Rabbit (second voice) in Winnie the Pooh (1931–2013)
 Diana Santos (voice of Belle in Beauty and the Beast, Mowgli in The Jungle Book and Jungle Cubs, Sunni Gummi and Princess Calla in Gummy Bears and Minnie Mouse) (born 1950) She debuted in dubbing in 1956. (still active)

1970s generation
 Patricia Acevedo: Voice of Lisa Simpson (first voice and current voice) in The Simpsons, Sailor Moon, Rachel Green in Friends and Angelica Pickles in Rugrats (still active) (born 1955)
 Enrique Mederos: Voice of Old Kai in Dragon Ball Z, Chucky in Child's Play 2 and 3, Clint Eastwood in Pale Rider (1967–2004)
 Germán Robles: Voice of KITT in Knight Rider (1929–2015)

1980s generation
 Rossy Aguirre: Voice of Akane Tendo in Ranma ½ (first voice), Sailor Mercury in Sailor Moon, Buttercup in The Powerpuff Girls, D.W. Read in Arthur, Phoebe Heyerdahl in Hey Arnold!, and Krillin in Dragon Ball (still active)
 Raúl Aldana: Voice of Alan Bradley/Tron in Tron, Will Turner in Pirates of the Caribbean, Kermit (current voice), Mickey Mouse (third voice), and Michael Paré (still active)
 Mario Castañeda: Voice of Goku in Dragon Ball, Jim Carrey, Cosmo Kramer in Seinfeld, James the Red Engine, Zapp Brannigan in Futurama, Nephrite in Sailor Moon, Bruce Willis and Johnny Cage in Mortal Kombat X
 Arturo Mercado Jr: Voice of Mickey Mouse in Latin Spanish, (the second voice of) Woody in Toy Story 3 and 4, Harry Osborn in all Peter Parker (Sam Raimi film series)
 Gabriel Chávez: Voice of Mr. Burns (first voice) in The Simpsons, Ed Bighead in Rocko's Modern Life, Grandpa Phil in Hey Arnold! and Buzz Buzzard in The New Woody Woodpecker Show (still active)
 Marina Huerta: Voice of Bart Simpson (first and third voice) and Marge Simpson (second voice) in The Simpsons and Chuckie Finster (first voice) in Rugrats (still active)
 Alejandro Illescas: Voice of Ken Masters in Street Fighter II: The Animated Movie, Genma Saotome in Ranma ½, and Boomhauer (first voice) in King of the Hill (1960–2008)
 Belinda Martinez: Voice of Sailor Uranus in Sailor Moon Sailor Stars (still active)
 María Fernanda Morales: Voice of Elaine in Seinfeld, Sailor Venus in Sailor Moon, Kimi Finster in Rugrats and All Grown Up!, Nala in The Lion King, Princess Peach, Tak in Invader Zim, Muffy Crosswire in Arthur, and Spencer Hastings in Pretty Little Liars (still active) (Born 1970)
 Gerardo Reyero: Voice of Han Solo (fourth voice), Jim Carrey, Freeza in Dragon Ball Z, V in V for Vendetta, Raiden in Mortal Kombat X and Mortal Kombat 11, Captain Hero in Drawn Together and Captain Gantu in Lilo & Stitch (still active)
 Benjamín Rivera: Voice of Philip J. Fry in Futurama (first voice), Nelson Muntz (first voice), John Connor (first voice), Ryoga Hibiki (second voice) in Ranma ½, Richard Watterson in The Amazing World of Gumball, and Leonardo in Teenage Mutant Ninja Turtles (third voice) (still active)
 Víctor Trujillo: Voice of Lion-O in Thundercats, James P. Sullivan, (a.k.a. "Sulley") in Monsters, Inc. (born 1961) (still active)
 Humberto Vélez: Voice of Homer Simpson (translated as "Homero") (first voice) in The Simpsons, Winnie The Pooh, The Penguin in Batman Arkham Origins and Batman Arkham Knight and Cyberdyne Systems Model 101 In Terminator (second voice) (born 1955) (still active)

1990s generation
 Liliana Barba: Voice of May (second voice) in Pokémon, Sango in InuYasha, Kyle Broflovski (first voice) in South Park, Daisy Duck (current voice) from Disney, Chuckie Finster (second voice) in Rugrats, Lizzie McGuire, Vanellope in Ralph Breaks the Internet (Second voice) and Mary Jane Watson in Spider-Man 3 and The Spectacular Spider-Man (still active)
 Irwin Daayán: Voice of Dende in Dragon Ball Z, Joe Shimamura in Cyborg 009, GIR in Invader Zim, Sheen in Jimmy Neutron, Kimimaro in Naruto, Winter Soldier in Marvel Cinematic Universe (First Voice) and Anakin Skywalker (still active) (born 1978)
 Enzo Fortuny: InuYasha, Arnold in Hey Arnold! (second voice), Bobby Hill in King of the Hill (first voice), Drake Parker in Drake & Josh, Takeda in Mortal Kombat X, Sid Phillips in Toy Story and Elijah Wood (still active) (born 1981)
 Eduardo Garza: Voice of Elmo (first voice), Big Bird (second voice), Xandir in Drawn Together, Gaara in Naruto, Josh Nichols in Drake & Josh, Pinocchio in the Shrek movies (excluding the first), Ichigo Kurosaki in Bleach, Nightwing in Batman Arkham Knight, Kung Lao, Rain and Reptile in Mortal Kombat X, Krillin in Dragon Ball Z (second voice) and Francis in Malcolm In The Middle (first voice) (still active) (born 1976)
 Rafael Pacheco: Voice of Kevin Levin in Ben 10: Alien Force, Ace in The Powerpuff Girls (second voice), Lenny in Camp Lazlo, and Principal Nigel Brown in The Amazing World of Gumball (still active)
 Claudia Motta: Voice of Bart Simpson (second voice) in The Simpsons, Applejack in My Little Pony, Mary Jane Watson in Spider-Man and Spider-Man 2 (first voice) Lila Sawyer in Hey Arnold! (still active).
 Xóchitl Ugarte: Voice of Misty in Pokémon, Sabrina, the Teenage Witch (second voice), Sami Brady in Days of Our Lives, Sam in Totally Spies!, Silver Sable in Marvel's Spider-Man and Brandy Hamilton in Brandy and Mr Whiskers (still active) (born 1979)

2000s generation
 Claudio Velázquez: Voice of Mac in Foster's Home for Imaginary Friends, Astro Boy, Baby Sylvester in Baby Looney Tunes (first voice), Jeremie Belpois in Code Lyoko (first voice), Max in Dragon Tales (second voice) (still active)

See also
 List of Mexicans

References

Mexican
Voice actors
Mexican voice actors
Mexican, Voice